Xanthorhoe columelloides is a species of moth in the family Geometridae first described by William Barnes and James Halliday McDunnough in 1913. It is found in North America.

The MONA or Hodges number for Xanthorhoe columelloides is 7393.

References

Further reading

 
 

Xanthorhoe
Articles created by Qbugbot
Moths described in 1913